The San Antonio Municipal Auditorium was a building located at 100 Auditorium Circle, San Antonio, Texas. It was built as a memorial to American soldiers killed in World War I.

The San Antonio Municipal Auditorium was also used as a concert venue.

The building was rebuilt and expanded into the Tobin Center for the Performing Arts in 2009-2014.

Construction
The limestone arena was built in 1926 and designed in Spanish Colonial Revival style by Atlee Ayres, his son Robert M. Ayres, and their associates George Willis and Emmett Jackson. In 1929, the American Institute of Architects awarded the architects a gold medal for the arena's design.  It was added to the National Register of Historic Places in 1981.

Features
Initially built to honor America's World War I military dead, the  structure is part of the Veterans Memorial Plaza. The white marble War Mothers Memorial  honoring the mothers whose sons who fought in World War I was erected at the corner of the arena in 1938 by the San Antonio Chapter No. 2 of American War Mothers. In front of the arena, Hill 881 South by sculptor Austin Deuel was dedicated to veterans of the Vietnam War in 1986. The 1994 Night Watch, aka Korean War Memorial,  by sculptor Jonas Perkins is across from the auditorium's front entrance. Near the Korean War Memorial  is the 1995 50th Anniversary of the Battle of the Bulge plaque on a granite monument.

Architecture
The  on which the auditorium is built was purchased from different entities, including a garden area from the Ursuline Academy. The 12-sided shape of the arena features carved stone and an arcade entrance complemented by a domed tower on each side.  Red stone tile and metal are used on the roof. The original interior featured two-level horseshoe-shaped seating. The design on the   asbestos auditorium stage curtain was the painting Founding of San Antonio by artist Hugo D. Pohl. The painting depicted the artist's vision of the 1718 founding of Presidio San Antonio de Bexar, and also included the Battle of the Alamo defenders James Bowie, Davy Crockett, William B. Travis and James Butler Bonham.

Restoration
At the time of the 1981 NRHP designation, the building stood vacant due a fire that had destroyed much of the interior in 1979 and rendered the asbestos curtain beyond repair.  An April 1981 voter bond referendum approved $9.1 million for restoration. The renovated auditorium was rededicated in 1985.

References

National Register of Historic Places in San Antonio
Atlee B. Ayres buildings
Event venues on the National Register of Historic Places in Texas